Éric Bellerose (born February 7, 1972) is a Canadian retired professional ice hockey player who played from 1993 until his retirement in 2007. Bellerose was drafted by the San Jose Sharks 147th overall in the 1992 NHL Entry Draft.

External links 
 

1972 births
Canadian ice hockey left wingers
Canadian people of French descent
French Quebecers
Hull Olympiques players
Montreal Roadrunners players
Ice hockey people from Montreal
Saint-Hyacinthe Laser players
San Jose Sharks draft picks
Trois-Rivières Draveurs players
Living people